The Child Abduction Act 1984 (c 37) is an Act of the Parliament of the United Kingdom. It creates offences that replace, in England and Wales, the offence of child stealing under section 56 of the Offences against the Person Act 1861.

Part I – Offences under the law of England and Wales

Section 1 – Offence of abduction of child by parent etc
Section 1(1) provides that, subject to sections 1(5) to (8), it is an offence for a person connected with a child under the age of sixteen to take or send the child out of the United Kingdom without the appropriate consent.

The following cases are relevant to this section:
R v C [1991] 2 FLR 252, [1991] Fam Law 522, CA
R v Sherry and El Yamani [1993] Crim LR 536, CA

Sentence

See section 4(1).

See the Crown Prosecution Service sentencing manual.

And see R v Brennan [2007] 2 Cr App R (S) 50

Section 2 – Offence of abduction of child by other persons
Section 2(1) provides that, subject to section 2(3), it is an offence for a person, other than one mentioned in section 2(2), to take or detain a child under the age of sixteen so as to remove him from the lawful control of any person having lawful control of him, or, so as to keep him out of the lawful control of any person entitled to lawful control of him. without lawful authority or reasonable excuse.

This section is disapplied by section 51 of the Children Act 1989 for any child who has been certified at risk and placed in a foster or care home.

The following cases are relevant:
R v Leather, 98 Cr App R 179, CA
R v Berry [1996] Crim LR 574, The Times, 29 January 1996, CA

Sentence

See section 4(1).

See the Crown Prosecution Service sentencing manual.

And see the following cases:
R v Dean [2000] 2 Cr App R (S) 253
R v Mawdsley [2001] 1 Cr App R (S) 101
R v Delaney [2003] 2 Cr App R (S) 81
R v J A and others [2002] 1 Cr App R (S) 108
R v Prime [2005] 1 Cr App R (S) 45
R v Delaney [2007] 1 Cr App R (S) 93
R v Serrant [2007] 2 Cr App R (S) 80
R v M [2008] 2 Cr App R (S) 73

Section 5 – Restriction on prosecutions for offence of kidnapping

Part II – Offence under the law of Scotland

Part III – Supplementary

Section 13 – Short title, commencement and extent
Section 13(2) provides that the Act came into force at the end of the period of three months that began on the day on which it was passed. The word "months" means calendar months.

The day (that is to say, 12 July 1984) on which the Act was passed (that is to say, received royal assent) is included in the period of three months.

This means that the Act came into force on 12 October 1984.

See also
 Child abduction

References
Halsbury's Statutes,

External links

The Child Abduction Act 1984, as amended from the National Archives
The Child Abduction Act 1984, as originally enacted from the National Archives
Crown Prosecution Service guidance - prosecuting cases of child abuse

United Kingdom Acts of Parliament 1984